Britannia is a British/American historical fantasy drama television show. It was created by Jez Butterworth and Tom Butterworth. The show was the first co-production between Sky and Amazon Prime Video and stars Kelly Reilly, David Morrissey, Zoë Wanamaker, Mackenzie Crook, Nikolaj Lie Kaas, and Eleanor Worthington Cox. It first aired on Sky Atlantic in the UK beginning 18 January 2018 and on Amazon Prime Video in the US beginning 26 January 2018. The first series aired on Epix beginning 2 August 2020.  Pop songs were used as theme music for the three series to date: Donovan's "Hurdy Gurdy Man" (series 1), his "Season of the Witch" (series 2), and "Children of the Revolution" by T. Rex (series 3).

Synopsis
Britannia is set in 43 AD, when the Romans invaded Britain. Julius Caesar had failed to conquer Britain 90 years earlier.

General Aulus Plautius and his second-in-command, Lucius are determined to succeed where Julius Caesar failed, by any means necessary.  An experienced warrior, Aulus establishes a fortified camp, gathers information from captives, even children, and learns that the Druids are the driving force behind the many tribes he faces.  He determines that "you don't conquer the people, you must conquer their gods."  He meets the Druids and undertakes a vision quest. Soon, he is talking aloud to Lokka, a demon king.

Young Cait of the Cantii tribe is about to take part in a ceremony to mark her becoming an adult woman when the Romans attack and largely destroy her tribe. She is forced to flee and wanders the forest, where she encounters and attaches herself to an unlikely protector, Divis "The Outcast".

Divis is a Druid with some mystical powers—divination, hypnosis, visions—but seems mad and has been driven into exile by Veran, leader of the Druids in Britannia.  Divis roams the countryside seeking clues to the meaning of his apocalyptic visions, and believes he is on some kind of mysterious "mission".

Kerra, a princess as the daughter of the Cantii King Pellenor, frets for her people's safety.  The Cantii are in a perpetual feud with the Regni, a powerful and large tribe.  The Cantii's only protection is an impregnable natural fortress formed from granite. Yet, King Pellenor makes no preparations to resist the Romans, other than relying on vague hints from the Druids to set policy.  Kerra's brother, Phelan, appears weak.  Kerra ambitiously takes her own steps to address the Roman threat, calling for a parley and venturing into Regni territory.  Her actions enrage her father, who sends her to be judged by the Druids, and possibly flayed alive, as happened to her mother.

In the maelstrom of confusion and fear caused by the invasion, Romans and Britons ally with, and betray, each other as the Romans consolidate their position and disaster looms.

Cast and characters

Romans
 David Morrissey as Aulus Plautius
 Fortunato Cerlino as Vespasian (Series 1)
 Hugo Speer as Lucius (Series 1-3)
 Daniel Caltagirone as Brutus (Series 1 and 3, guest Series 2)
 Aaron Pierre as Antonius (Series 1)
 Zaqi Ismail as Philo (Series 1 and 3, guest Series 2)
 Gershwyn Eustache Jnr as Vitus (Series 1-3)
 René Zagger as Decimus (Series 1)
 Gerard Monaco as Roman Deserter 2 (Series 1)
 Steve Pemberton as Emperor Claudius (Series 2)
 Sophie Okonedo as Hemple, wife of Aulus Plautius (Series 3)

Cantii

 Kelly Reilly as Kerra (Series 1)
 Ian McDiarmid as King Pellenor (Series 1)
 Julian Rhind-Tutt as Phelan
 Annabel Scholey as Amena
 Samantha Colley as Andra (Series 2)
 Barry Ward as Sawyer (Series 1, guest Series 2 and 3)
 Callie Cooke as Islene (Series 1, guest Series 3)
 Eleanor Worthington Cox as Cait

Regni

 Zoë Wanamaker as Queen Antedia (Series 1 and 3, guest Series 2)
 Joe Armstrong as Gildas (Series 1)
 Liana Cornell as Ania

Druids
 Mackenzie Crook as Veran and Harka
 Gianni Calchetti as Rork Druid and Moss Face
 Jodie McNee as Willa
 Jack Roth as Ossian (Series 1)
 David Bradley as Quane
 Abigail Rice as Elder 1
 Peter Hosking as Elder 2 (Recurring)
 Bluey Robinson as Rayne (Series 3)

Other
 Nikolaj Lie Kaas as Divis / The Outcast
 Stanley Weber as Lindon of the Gauls (Series 1)
 Gary Oliver as Jhehutamisu (Guest)
 Tolga Safer as Aziz (Guest)
 Laura Donnelly as Hella (Series 1-2, guest Series 3)
 Liran Nathan as Crucified Man (Guest)

Episodes

Series overview
</onlyinclude>

Series 1 (2018)
Note: Every episode was available in the United Kingdom by download from Sky "catch up" following the first episode satellite broadcast.

Series 2 (2019)
Note: Every episode was available in the United Kingdom by download from Sky "catch up" following the first episode satellite broadcast.

Series 3 (2021)
Note: Every episode was available in the United Kingdom by download from Sky "catch up" following the first episode satellite broadcast. Episodes 2 to 8 premiered on Sky Atlantic in Germany.

Production
The first series was produced by Rick McCallum, Vertigo Films and Neal Street Productions and shot on location in Czech Republic and Wales. Most dialogue in the series is spoken in English, which is used mostly to represent Vulgar Latin spoken by the Romans and Brythonic spoken by the Celts. Latin and Welsh (with English subtitles) are also used to represent both ancient languages, respectively, particularly in rituals and other scenes with formulaic language.

In March 2018, it was announced that Sky Atlantic had renewed the show for a second series. Amazon was not involved in production and did not stream the second season.

The show was renewed for a third series in January 2020. In June 2020, U.S. premium network Epix announced it would partner with Sky to produce the third series. It would also air the first series beginning August 2, 2020, and the second series beginning October 4, 2020. Filming of the third series was shut down in March 2020 due to the Coronavirus pandemic, and resumed in September 2020.

Season 2 began streaming on Amazon Prime in June 2021.

Reception 

The first season received positive reviews. The review aggregator website Rotten Tomatoes reported a 76% approval rating, with an average rating of 6.54/10 based on 37 reviews, with site's critics consensus saying: 

On Metacritic, which uses a weighted average, the first season scored 70 out of 100, based on eight reviews, indicating "generally favorable reviews".

References

External links

2010s American drama television series
2020s American drama television series
2018 American television series debuts
2021 American television series endings
2010s British drama television series
2020s British drama television series
2018 British television series debuts
2021 British television series endings
American action television series
American fantasy drama television series
American fantasy television series
British fantasy television series
British historical television series
Dark fantasy television series
Demons in television
Druidry in fiction
English-language television shows
Fiction set in Roman Britain
Amazon Prime Video original programming
Sky Atlantic original programming
Television about magic
Television dramas set in ancient Rome
Television series by All3Media
Television shows filmed in the Czech Republic
Television series set in the Roman Empire
Witchcraft in television
Television series set in the 1st century